William Clemens may refer to:

 William Clemens (film director) (1905–1980), American film director

 William A. Clemens Jr. (1932—2020), paleontologist
 William Clemens (public servant) (1873–1941), Australian public servant
 William Roger Clemens (born 1962), baseball player

See also
William Clements (disambiguation)